is an international consultant. He is the President of Ishii Brothers' Co., located in Tokyo, Japan, an independent consulting firm and licensed publisher.

Personal
He was born in Hokkaido in 1965. He graduated from the University of Tokyo Medical Department with a Ph.D.

Positions
 Advisor to the Prime Minister Office of Japan for Tourism Promotion Planning (since Nov 2015) 
 A member of Tourism Promotion Committee of The Ministry of Land, Infrastructure, Transport and Tourism of Japan (since April 2013)
 Advisor to Japan Tourism Agency (since Feb 2015)
 Advisor to Hokkaido regional government for Tourism Promotion (since NOV 2015)
 Advisor to Hokkaido Tourism Organization (since October 2013)
 Deputy Executive Director of CAPDI (Centrist Asia Pacific Democrats International)
 Honorable advisor to the Embassy of Dominican Republic to Japan
 Special Advisor to the Embassy of Rwanda Republic to Japan
 Advisor to Nikkei Ducare, a magazine published by Nikkei

Books
"The Integrated Resorts in the World" (2015), Ishii Brothers' Company.
"The system of Risk Management" (2010), Toyo Keizai, Tokyo.
"Keio Elementary school" (2010), Gentosha, Tokyo.
"Choice and result of myself who graduated global capitalism" (2011), Nikkei BP, Tokyo.
"Sorge, Caviar, & Azerbaijan" An official travel guide for Azerbaijan approved by Minister of Tourism and Culture of Azerbaijan (2013), Ishii Brothers' Company, Tokyo.
"Keio Yochisha Elementary School and Keio Yokohama Elementary School" (2013), Asahi Shimbun, Tokyo.

TV
 Honma Dekka TV, Fuji Television
 Matsuko no Shiranai Sekai, TBS
 FX Philosophy 3.0, Theater Television

References

1965 births
Living people
Japanese publishers (people)